Rebel Cheer Squad is a British teen thriller series that premiered on BBC iPlayer on 14 February 2022. The series acts as a spin-off series to Get Even (2020), both of which were adapted by Holly Phillips from the book series Don't Get Mad by Gretchen McNeil. Rebel Cheer Squad, like its predecessor, focuses on a group of schoolgirls who form a group to expose bullies at their school.

Cast

Main
 Renee Bailey as Leila Harris
 Amelia Brooks as Grace Ellington
 Lashay Anderson as Clara Harris
 Ashling O'Shea as Rumi Joshi
 Elliott Wooster as Sam

Recurring
 Asha Banks as Brooke
 Kat Ronney as Viola
 Don Gilet as Coach Harris
 Aaron Garland as Reece
 Olivia-Mai Barrett as Meg "Mouse" Beeman
 Ramanique Ahluwalia as Jess
 Ryan Quarmby as Miles
 Kirsty Hoiles as Ms Carson
 Niyi Akin as Evan

Guest
 Jessie Mae Alonzo as May
 Jake Dunn as Christopher

Development
Following the premiere of Get Even on BBC iPlayer in 2020, production on a follow-up series relating to Get Even began a year later. The BBC confirmed that the series, titled Rebel Cheer Squad, would be set in the same school with the students from Get Even having graduated and the DGM being inspirations to the new students at Bannerman School. The BBC hinted that the programme would follow friends and cheerleaders Grace, Clara and Rumi becoming the new DGM to pursue justice for their school, while also "experiencing the twists and turns of teenage life". Bustle noted that some viewers of Get Even were hoping for a continuation of the series, Rebel Cheer Squad would still feature the spirit of its prior series, just via a new generation of students. Like Get Even, the series was filmed at Bolton School, one of the largest private schools in England.

Like Get Even, Rebel Cheer Squad is based on one of the books from the Don't Get Mad book series by author Gretchen McNeil. The series is a co-production between the BBC, Netflix and Boat Rocker Studios. The series began airing on CBBC on 14 February 2022, with a simultaneous release of all eight episodes on BBC iPlayer. The series is set to be internationally distributed on Netflix on 29th July 2022.

Episodes

References

External links
 
 

2022 British television series debuts
2022 British television series endings
2020s British crime drama television series
2020s British mystery television series
2020s British teen television series
2020s teen drama television series
BBC crime drama television shows
British detective television series
British teen drama television series
British thriller television series
English-language television shows
Television series about bullying
Television series about sisters
Television series about teenagers